The Hartlepools by-election was a Parliamentary by-election held on 20 June 1910. The constituency returned one Member of Parliament (MP) to the House of Commons of the United Kingdom, elected by the first past the post voting system.

Vacancy
Sir Christopher Furness had been Liberal MP for the seat of The Hartlepools since the 1900 general election. His re-election in January 1910 was declared void after an electoral petition causing the need for the by-election. The Petitioners (Joseph Foster Wilson and John Roger Butterwick) alleged illegal practices in illegal payments to certain persons, for marks of distinction and for conveyance of voters to the poll. It was also alleged that the maximum campaign expenditure allowed had been exceeded and that a false return of expenses had been made by the Butler, Furness's Election Agent. Butler, who was the private secretary of Furness, charged nothing for his services and clerks in the employ of Furness's firm rendered clerical assistance without payment. The return of Election expenses made was only a few shillings below the maximum allowed. Mr Justice Phillimore commented "If it could be said that Butler's appointment was wholly political, or that he was retained partly as a private secretary and also for the political work of Sir Christopher, if he was an extra Agent during the Election, then it would be necessary to return a proportionate part of the salary as being an expense of the Election. It was said that the real reason why he was not paid anything was the fact that Sir Christopher's expenses came within a few shillings of the maximum, but there was no evidence of any contract to the effect that Sir Christopher Furness would pay the Election Agent's fee if he could do so without exceeding the maximum of expense." As to the clerks, Mr. Justice Phillimore said : — " The evidence with regard to the employment on the Election day of clerks in the service of Furness, Withy & Co. was incomplete. He was not able to say, on the evidence, whether they ought to consider Furness, Withy & Co., Ltd., as a separate person from Sir Christopher, under another name.

Electoral history
The seat had been won by the Liberal Party at every election since 1874, apart from 1886 and 1895 when a former Liberal standing as a Liberal Unionist won. Furness easily held the seat at the last election;

Candidates
The local Liberal Association selected 38-year-old Stephen Furness to defend the seat. He was the nephew of the unseated MP. Furness was educated at Ashville College, Harrogate. He was a member of the prominent ship-owning family from West Hartlepool. He was an elected to West Hartlepool Town Council in 1897 and Durham County Council in 1898.
The Conservatives retained 40-year-old Howard Gritten as their candidate. Gritten was born in London and educated at Brasenose College, Oxford, where he won the Donald E. Bridgman Essay Prize, and graduated with honours in Literae Humaniores. He was a barrister.

Campaign
Polling Day was fixed for the 20 June 1910.

Result
Furness held the seat with a reduced majority;

Aftermath
Furness held the seat at the following General Election six months later with a further reduced majority;

References

Politics of the Borough of Hartlepool
1910 elections in the United Kingdom
1910 in England
20th century in County Durham
Hartlepools, The